Surella Morales (born 16 June 1963) is a Cuban sprinter. She competed in the women's 4 × 400 metres relay at the 1996 Summer Olympics.

References

1963 births
Living people
Athletes (track and field) at the 1996 Summer Olympics
Cuban female sprinters
Olympic athletes of Cuba
Goodwill Games medalists in athletics
Athletes (track and field) at the 1995 Pan American Games
Pan American Games gold medalists for Cuba
Pan American Games medalists in athletics (track and field)
Place of birth missing (living people)
Competitors at the 1994 Goodwill Games
Medalists at the 1995 Pan American Games
Olympic female sprinters
20th-century Cuban women